District 1 of the Texas Senate is a senatorial district that serves all of Bowie, Camp, Cass, Franklin, Gregg, Harrison, Lamar, Marion, Morris, Panola, Red River, Rusk, Titus, Upshur, Wood and Smith counties in the U.S. state of Texas. The current Senator from District 1 is Bryan Hughes.

Election history

2020

2016

2012

2010

2006

2004

2002

1998

1994

1992

District officeholders

References

01
Bowie County, Texas
Camp County, Texas
Cass County, Texas
Franklin County, Texas
Gregg County, Texas
Harrison County, Texas
Lamar County, Texas
Marion County, Texas
Morris County, Texas
Panola County, Texas
Red River County, Texas
Rusk County, Texas
Titus County, Texas
Upshur County, Texas
Wood County, Texas
Smith County, Texas
Texarkana, Texas